Marked Tree is a city in Poinsett County, Arkansas, United States, along the St. Francis River, at the mouth of the Little River. The population was 2,566 at the 2010 census. It is included in the Jonesboro, Arkansas, metropolitan statistical area.

Geologically, the area marks the southern end of the New Madrid Fault.

Toponymy
Marked Tree has been noted on lists of unusual place names.

Geography
Marked Tree is located on the St. Francis River at the intersection of US Route 63 and Arkansas Highways 140, 149, and 308. The south end of the Marked Tree Floodway lies just west of the city.

Demographics

2020 census

As of the 2020 United States census, there were 2,286 people, 922 households, and 585 families residing in the city.

2000 census
As of the census of 2000,  2,800 people, 1,126 households, and 731 families were residing in the city. The 1,234 housing units averaged 532.7 per square mile (205.4/km2). The racial makeup of the city was 50.36% White, 47.07% African American, 0.11% Native American, 0.29% Asian, 1.25% from other races, and 0.93% from two or more races. About 2.07% of the population were Hispanics or Latinos of any race.

Of the 1,126 households,  29.7% had children under the age of 18 living with them, 41.9% were married couples living together, 19.4% had a female householder with no husband present, and 35.0% were not families. About 31.9% of all households were made up of individuals, and 14.5% had someone living alone who was 65 years of age or older.  The average household size was 2.39, and the average family size was 3.04.

In the city, the population was distributed as 26.5% under the age of 18, 8.4% from 18 to 24, 24.1% from 25 to 44, 21.9% from 45 to 64, and 19.1% who were 65 years of age or older.  The median age was 38 years. For every 100 females, there were 87.4 males.  For every 100 females age 18 and over, there were 79.0 males.

The median income for a household in the city was $22,591, and for a family was $30,197. Males had a median income of $26,305 versus $19,602 for females. The per capita income for the city was $11,867.  About 25.6% of families and 32.3% of the population were below the poverty line, including 47.4% of those under age 18 and 28.0% of those age 65 or over.

Education 
Public education for early childhood, elementary, and secondary-school students is provided by the Marked Tree School District. Until 1966, a dual system of education was provided with one set of schools for White children, and a different set for Blacks. The first school for Blacks was built in 1938, and was named George Washington Carver from 1952 until it was closed in 1966.

As of 2018, the Marked Tree School District consists of:
 Marked Tree Elementary School, serving prekindergarten through 6th grade
 Marked Tree High School, serving grades 7 through 12

Notable people
Fannie Lewis, Cleveland, Ohio's longest-serving councilwoman, was from Marked Tree and attended George Washington Carver High School.

References

External links
Crittenden County Open Portal Website
 https://web.archive.org/web/20070114112944/http://www.markedtreearkansas.org/index.htm

Cities in Poinsett County, Arkansas
Cities in Arkansas
Jonesboro metropolitan area